The Max Rady College of Medicine is a medical college of the University of Manitoba in Winnipeg and is one of several departments of the University's Rady Faculty of Health Sciences.

Opening in 1883 as the Manitoba Medical College, it is the first medical school of the Prairie provinces. The College has 27 academic departments, institutes, and administrative units found throughout the University's Bannatyne campus, the Health Sciences Centre, and other Winnipeg health sciences facilities. The college also consists of several centres, institutes, and research groups, often in partnership with other health sciences organizations.

In 2009, there were 957 applicants for 110 MD spots. The average GPA was 4.16 (out of 4.5) and the MCAT average was 10.72 in 2009. The nearby University of Winnipeg also offers a pre-medical studies program.

History
The Manitoba Medical College was privately founded by physicians and surgeons in the nascent days of Winnipeg, when hospitals were only beginning to appear and the need for a medical school in the Prairies was starting to become evident.

In 1883, failing to convince others of building a medical school, 13 young prospective doctors petitioned the Manitoba Legislature to charter the Manitoba Medical College as a private medical college. They applied for an Act of Incorporation for a medical college, for which 2 key principles were agreed upon: first, the degrees would be granted by the University of Manitoba, not the Medical College; second, the Medical College would be founded by established practitioners, maintaining the continued involvement and responsibility of the physicians in the Winnipeg community.

On 13 November 1883, the School Board assented to use of the Central Collegiate Institute (26 Isabel Street) for the Medical College. On the evening of Thursday, 15 November 1883, James Kerr, the first Dean of Medicine, delivered his inaugural address to the School:This fact, I think, is somewhat characteristic of the country in which we live and its extraordinary progressive tendencies, for I believe it to be the first time in the history of medicine that the student requested that he should be supplied with teachers, instead of teachers soliciting the students to be taught.A week later, the first lecture at the College was given by Dr. R. J. Blanchard. Initially held in a temporary space, the Medical College was moved to a building located on 561 McDermot Avenue, at the corner of Kate Street; this original building would eventually be sold and turned into the St. Regis Apartments.

In 1892, the Manitoba Medical College saw its first female graduate, Hattie Foxton, who passed her exams with first-class standing for Doctor of Medicine and Master of Surgery.

In 1884, the Medical College building was given a large expansion. In 1897, the Bacteriological Research Building of the Manitoba Medical College was designed by architect Charles Henry Wheeler.

In 1900, the University of Manitoba Act allowed the U of M to do its own teaching and appoint full-time professors to the Medical College, which it did in 1904 (bacteriologist, physiologist, botanist, and physicist). A year later, an obstetrics department was also added.

Despite a large expansion just years earlier, the College still could not accommodate the demand for more space. As result, in 1906, the College was moved to a building on 750 Bannatyne Avenue, at the corner Emily Street. The facility was built in 1905 by local contractors S.B. Ritchie & P. Burnett and was designed by architect James H. Cadham. The second building of the College, at 770 Bannatyne, was erected in 1921.

In 1919, the Manitoba Medical College was absorbed by the University of Manitoba, becoming its Faculty of Medicine.

In 1932, the college adopted an official quota system to reduce the number of Jews entering the medical profession. The antisemitic quota system was instituted by Dr. Alvin Trotter Mathers, the Dean of the college. The quota system was abolished in 1945-1946.

In 1955, a building was built to house the library, microbiology, and cafeteria wing of the Manitoba Medical College, and opened the following year. Located on McDermot Avenue, the building now houses the College of Rehabilitation Sciences. The Faculty of Medicine also added various other new buildings including: the Chown Building (753 McDermot Ave.) in 1965 at the south end of the Medical College Building; the Basic Medical Services Building (730 William Ave.), completed in 1974, located across Bannatyne Avenue from the Medical College Building and originally attached by overhead walkway; and the Brodie Centre (727 McDermot Ave.), built on the east side of the Medical College Building and dedicated in 1996.

The University of Manitoba, Faculty of Medicine's Arms were registered with the Canadian Heraldic Authority on 15 August 2008.

The Manitoba Medical Alumni Association erected the Medical Corps Memorial in dedication to the memory of the graduates and students of the University of Manitoba Medical College who had laid down their lives during the 1885 North West Rebellion (1 name); 1900 South African War (1 name); and The Great War of 1914–18, or World War I, (7 names). Part of the Memorial reads, "In enduring remembrance of the Graduates and students of this school who laid down their lives in Wars of the Empire, their names are here inscribed by the Manitoba Medical Alumni Association.... To you from falling hands we throw the torch. Be yours to hold high."

In 2014, the University brought together its health-sciences community to form the Faculty of Health Sciences, into which the Faculty of Medicine was incorporated along with the Faculties of Dentistry, Nursing, Pharmacy and Schools of Dental Hygiene and Medical Rehabilitation. Today, the former Faculty of Medicine is known as the College of Medicine within the health sciences faculty.

In 2016, the College changed its name to the Max Rady College of Medicine as part of a legacy honouring Max and Rose Rady, cemented by Ernest and Evelyn Rady, through the Rady Family Foundation, who announced a $30-million gift to the university on 12 May 2016—the largest philanthropic gift in the University's history.

Departments
The College consists of 22 academic departments found throughout the U of M Bannatyne Campus, the Health Sciences Centre (HSC), and other Winnipeg health sciences facilities. Each department is involved in teaching, research, service and clinical activities with an academic staff of approximately 1,630 faculty members.

The Department of Community Health Sciences (CHS) was created in 1987 through the merging of the Department of Social and Preventive Medicine (SPM) and the Division of Community and Northern Medicine (CNM).

Centres 
The college also consists of several centres, institutes, and research groups, often in partnership with other health sciences organizations. Some exist as units within the Faculty of Medicine.

Notable alumni and faculty
John C. Boileau Grant – Professor of Anatomy (1919–1930) – Author of Grant's Atlas of Anatomy and Grant's Dissector
William Boyd – Professor of Pathology (1919–1937) – Author of Surgical Pathology, Pathology of Internal Disease, Textbook of Pathology and Introduction to Medical Science

References

External links 
Faculty of Medicine – University of Manitoba
Annual Report of the City of Winnipeg: Historical Buildings & Resources Committee - The Year Past 2019

Medicine
Manitoba
1883 establishments in Manitoba
Rady family